Gordonia shandongensis is a bacterium from the genus Gordonia which has been isolated from farmland soil in China.

References

External links
Type strain of Gordonia shandongensis at BacDive -  the Bacterial Diversity Metadatabase	

Mycobacteriales
Bacteria described in 2007